Alycia Butterworth (born October 1, 1992) is a Canadian track and field athlete specializing in the 3000 metres steeplechase event. Butterworth's hometown is Parksville, British Columbia.

Career
Butterworth competed collegiately for the Idaho Vandals in both track and cross country from 2010 to 2015.

At the 2017 World Championships in Athletics in London, Butterworth finished 26th in the heats of the 3000 metres steeplechase.

In July 2021, Butterworth was named to Canada's 2020 Olympic team in the  women's 3000 metres steeplechase.

References

External links
 

Living people
Canadian female track and field athletes
1992 births
People from Prince Rupert, British Columbia
Sportspeople from British Columbia
Idaho Vandals women's track and field athletes
Athletes (track and field) at the 2020 Summer Olympics
Olympic track and field athletes of Canada